Joy Sengupta (born 14 December 1968) is an Indian film and stage actor works Bollywood cinema and Bengali cinema as well as theatre.

He is best known for his debut feature,  Hazaar Chaurasi Ki Maa (1998) directed by Govind Nihalani.

Sengupta was born in Kolkata, and grew up in Delhi and Nepal. He did his graduation in English literature from Delhi University, During this period he joined Jana Natya Manch, a theatre group based in Delhi. Thereafter received a Diploma in Drama from the Living Theatre Academy, New Delhi, where he studied under Ebrahim Alkazi. After working in theatre, telefilms and television series in Delhi, Sengupta shifted to Mumbai in 1997.

Career
Sengupta starred in Hazaar Chaurasi Ki Maa (1998) a film by Govind Nihalani. Thereafter, Sengupta starred in number of films like Good Boy Bad Boy (2007), Shakal Pe Mat Ja (2011), Hate Story (2012), and Deham, also directed by Govind Nihalani. Over the years, he has worked with theatre directors like Habib Tanvir, Safdar Hashmi, Barry John, Feroz Abbas Khan, Ramu Ramanathan and Lillete Dubey.

He married former model from Kolkata, Tara in 2006.

Filmography

Films

 Hazaar Chaurasi Ki Maa as Brati Chatterjee
 Deham
 Bhalo Theko
 Jara Bristite Bhijechhilo
 Good Boy Bad Boy
 68 Pages
 Chaturanga
 Aladin
 Anjaana Anjaani
 Shakal Pe Mat Ja
 Kagojer Bou 
 Hate Story
 Tabe Tai Hok
 Patalghar
 Bhopal: A Prayer for Rain
 Children of War
 Path Ghat 
 Teenkahon
 Khola Hawa
 RoughBook
 Parobash
 Bilu Rakkhosh
 Biday Byomkesh
 Lubdh
 Bhalo Maye Kharap Maye
 Class of '83
 Sohorer Upokotha
 Ek Chup (Short film) as Dr Shekhar

Television
 Waaris
 Aarambh as Arvamudan, Devsena's father 
 Kucchh Pal Saath Tumhara
 Mr Gayab
 X Zone
 Antaral as Sudhir
 Sacred Games as Mathur
 Hello web series as Ananyo
Hello Mini As Mini's BossNagin 2Poison 2 (2020) as Home Secretary

Plays
 Dance Like a Man Dinner With Friends Sheerin shah Doll's House''

Dubbing career
He is known for dubbing for Chris Evans as Steve Rogers / Captain America in Marvel Cinematic Universe films in Hindi.

Dubbing roles

Live action series

Live action films

Hollywood films

South Indian films

See also
Dubbing (filmmaking)
List of Indian Dubbing Artists

References

External links
 
 

1974 births
Living people
Indian male stage actors
Male actors from Kolkata
Male actors in Hindi cinema
Male actors in Bengali cinema
Indian male film actors
Male actors from Delhi
Delhi University alumni